Pseudobutyrivibrio is a Gram-negative, anaerobic and non-spore-forming bacterial genus from the family of Lachnospiraceae.

Pseudobutyrivibrio as Gram-negative, is in contrast to Butyrivibrio, which is Gram-positive, as is typical of most Bacillota phylum bacteria.

References

Further reading 
 
 

Lachnospiraceae
Bacteria genera